Alan James Glazier (21 January 1939 – 12 November 2020) was an English professional darts player. He used the nickname "The Ton Machine" and was noted for his all-black outfits.

Career

Glazier was one of the first darts players who turned professional in an attempt to make a full-time living from the game of darts as it grew in popularity during the 1970s. He was one of the players who appeared in the very first World Professional Darts Championship in 1978, losing to Alan Evans in the first round. In 1979, he reached the quarter-finals at the World Championship before being beaten by Tony Brown. Glazier then had a disappointing run as he went out in the first round of the World Championship in 1980, 1982 and 1983, and did not make it to the 1981 Championships.

His best run at the World Championships came in 1985, losing a quarter-final to Eric Bristow, and in 1986, when he reached the semi-finals for the only time, again falling to Bristow. Glazier's last appearance at the Lakeside Country Club was in 1987, when he lost in the first round to Richie Gardner.

Outside of the World Championship, Glazier managed to reach the final of the News of the World Darts Championship in 1979 and won the Swedish Open in 1978.

Glazier appeared on the UK television show Bullseye 15 times as one of the professionals and he represented England 27 times between the years 1974–1988.

Glazier quit the BDO in 1997. He went on to sell and distribute his own darts of the same design as the ones he used as a professional. These were originally manufactured by Winmau Darts but more recently are made by McKicks Darts.

Glazier died on 12 November 2020 at the age of 81.

World Championship results

BDO

 1978: 1st Round (lost to Alan Evans 4–6) (legs)
 1979: Quarter Finals (lost to Tony Brown 2–3) (sets) 
 1980: 1st Round (lost to Tony Clark 0–2) 
 1982: 1st Round (lost to Bobby George 1–2)
 1983: 1st Round (lost to Jerry Umberger 0–2)
 1984: 2nd Round (lost to Jocky Wilson 0–4)
 1985: Quarter Finals (lost to Eric Bristow 0–4)
 1986: Semi Finals (lost to Eric Bristow 3–5)
 1987: 1st Round (lost to Ritchie Gardner 0–3)

Career finals

Independent major finals: 1 (1 runner-up)

Performance timeline

References

External links
Alan Glazier's profile and stats on Darts Database
 

1939 births
2020 deaths
English darts players
People from Hampton, London
British Darts Organisation players
Sportspeople from London